Kaitlyn Christian and Sabrina Santamaria were the defending champions, but chose not to participate.

Caty McNally and Jessica Pegula won the title, defeating Anna Danilina and Ingrid Neel in the final, 6–1, 5–7, [11–9].

Seeds

Draw

Draw

References
Main Draw

Mercer Tennis Classic - Doubles